The Dașor is a right tributary of the river Iad in Romania. It flows into the Iad in Remeți.

References

Rivers of Romania
Rivers of Bihor County